Romario Roland Barthéléry (born 24 June 1994) is a French football player who represents Martinique internationally. He plays for Golden Lion.

International
He made his Martinique national football team debut on 26 March 2018 in a friendly against Trinidad & Tobago.

He was selected for the 2019 CONCACAF Gold Cup squad.

References

External links
 
 

1994 births
Living people
Martiniquais footballers
Martinique international footballers
Association football defenders
Golden Lion FC players
2019 CONCACAF Gold Cup players
2021 CONCACAF Gold Cup players